Jennifer duBois (born August 25, 1983) is an American novelist. duBois is a recipient of a Whiting Award and has been named a "5 Under 35" honoree by the National Book Foundation.

Life and Work
duBois is a graduate of Tufts University and the Iowa Writers’ Workshop. From 2009 to 2011, she was a Stegner Fellow at Stanford University.

Her debut novel, A Partial History of Lost Causes, was the winner of the California Book Award for First Fiction and the Northern California Book Award for Fiction, and was a finalist for the PEN/Hemingway Award for Debut Fiction. Her second novel, Cartwheel, was the winner of the Housatonic Book Award and a finalist for the New York Public Library’s Young Lions Award. In 2018, she received a fellowship from the National Endowment for the Arts for her third novel, The Spectators.

Her short stories, novel excerpts, reviews, and essays have appeared in the New York Times, the Wall Street Journal, Playboy, Narrative, Lapham’s Quarterly, American Short Fiction, The Kenyon Review, The Missouri Review, Salon, Cosmopolitan, ZYZZYVA, and elsewhere.

duBois is a permanent member of the faculty at Texas State University, where she teaches Fiction in the Creative Writing Department. She lives in Austin, Texas.

Novels

Awards and Fellowships
 2009–2011: Wallace Stegner Fellow, Stanford University
 2012: National Book Foundation "5 Under 35" Honoree
 2013: California Book Award for First Fiction (for A Partial History of Lost Causes)
 2013: Northern California Book Award for Fiction (for A Partial History of Lost Causes)
 2013: Finalist, PEN/Hemingway Prize for Debut Fiction (for A Partial History of Lost Causes)
 2013: Whiting Award for Fiction
 2014: Finalist, New York Public Library Young Lions Award (for Cartwheel)
 2014: Housatonic Book Award (for Cartwheel)
2018: National Endowment for the Arts Fellow (for The Spectators)

References

External links

Official website
"Lost Innocence, Abroad" [interview]
"Finding Meaning in Defeat: An Interview with Jennifer duBois"
‘Cartwheel’ By Jennifer DuBois: The Book We’re Talking About

1983 births
Living people
Tufts University alumni
Iowa Writers' Workshop alumni
Texas State University faculty
American women novelists
21st-century American novelists
21st-century American women writers
Novelists from Texas
Stegner Fellows
American women academics